Michael (or Mike) Clark may refer to:

Music
 Mike Clark (jazz musician) (born 1946), American jazz drummer
 Mike Clark (guitarist), Suicidal Tendencies guitarist
 Mike Clark (indie rock musician), guitarist and keyboardist for Stephen Malkmus and the Jicks
 Mike E. Clark, rap music producer

Politics
 Michael Clark (British politician) (born 1935), British politician
 Michael Clark (Canadian politician) (1861–1926), Member of Parliament, 1908–1921

Sports
 Michael Clark (English footballer), English football player
 Michael Clark (Australian footballer) (born 1981), Australian rules footballer
 Michael Clark (New Zealand cricketer) (born 1966), New Zealand cricketer
 Michael Clark (sportsman) (born 1978), Western Warriors cricketer and Australian Football League player
 Mick Clark, rugby league footballer of the 1960s for Great Britain, and Leeds
 Mike Clark (American football, born 1954), American football strength and conditioning coach
 Mike Clark (placekicker) (1940–2002), former Dallas Cowboys kicker
 Mike Clark (defensive end) (born 1959), former American football player
 Mike Clark (baseball) (1922–1996), Major League Baseball player
 Mike Clark (racing driver), racing driver in NASCAR
 Michael Clark (boxer) (born 1973), American boxer
 Mike Clark (soccer) (born 1972), American soccer player
 Michael Clark II (born 1969), American golfer
 Michael Clark (wide receiver) (born 1995), American football player

Other
 Michael Clark (dancer) (born 1962), British post-punk ballet dancer
 Michael Clark (artist) (born 1954), British contemporary artist
 Michael Clark (philosopher) (1940–2019), former philosophy professor at The University of Nottingham; editor of philosophy journal Analysis (2000–2016).
 Michael Stephen Clark, American newspaper columnist
 Michael William Clark, British industrialist and High Sheriff of Essex
 Mickey Clark, stock market analyst
 Mike Clark (critic) (1947–2020), American film critic
 Mike Clark, Detroit-based radio host and member of Drew and Mike Podcast

See also
 Michael Clarke (disambiguation)
 Micheal Clark, president and CEO of the National Academy of Sports Medicine